Lautaro Cruz Lusnig (born 14 October 1998) is an Argentine professional footballer who plays as a centre-back for Estudiantes BA.

Career
Lusnig started his career with All Boys. He appeared five times in the 2017–18 campaign in Primera B Nacional, including for his debut which came in a 1–1 draw against Independiente Rivadavia on 2 February. After relegation in 2017–18, Lusnig played in twelve fixtures in the first part of the subsequent Primera B Metropolitana campaign.

In January 2022, Lusnig joined Estudiantes de Buenos Aires.

Career statistics
.

References

External links

1998 births
Living people
Footballers from Buenos Aires
Argentine footballers
Association football defenders
Primera Nacional players
Primera B Metropolitana players
All Boys footballers
Estudiantes de Buenos Aires footballers